Sharon High School is a school in Sharon, Massachusetts, United States

Sharon High School may also refer to:

 Sharon Middle/High School, in the Sharon City School District, Sharon, Pennsylvania, United States